Sonic Corporation, founded as Sonic Drive-In and more commonly known as Sonic (stylized as SONIC) or "The Drive-In", is an American drive-in fast food restaurant chain owned by Inspire Brands, the parent company of Arby's and Buffalo Wild Wings. Sonic, founded by Troy N. Smith Sr., opened its first location in 1953, under the name Top Hat Drive-In. Originally a walk-up root beer stand outside a log cabin steakhouse selling soda, hamburgers, and hotdogs, Sonic currently has 3,545 locations in the United States.  Sonic is known for its use of carhops on roller skates, and hosts an annual competition (in most locations) to determine the top skating carhop in the company. The company's core products include the "Chili Cheese Coney", "Sonic Cheeseburger Combo", "Sonic Blasts", "Master Shakes", and "Wacky Pack Kids Meals". The company also has a breakfast menu.

History

Following World War II, Sonic founder Troy N. Smith Sr. returned to his hometown of Seminole, Oklahoma, where he became employed as a milkman. He decided to work delivering bread because bread is lighter than milk. Soon afterwards, Smith purchased the Cottage Cafe, a little diner in Shawnee, Oklahoma. Before long, he sold it and opened a fast food restaurant, Troy's Pan Full of Chicken, on the edge of town. In 1953, Smith joined with a business partner to purchase a five-acre parcel of land that had a log house and a walk-up root beer stand named the Top Hat. The two continued operating the root beer stand and converted the log house into a steak restaurant. After realizing that the stand was averaging $700 a week in the sale of root beer, hamburgers, and hot dogs, Smith decided to focus on the more-profitable root beer stand. He bought out his business partner.

Originally, Top Hat customers parked their automobiles anywhere on the gravel parking lot and walk up to place orders. In Louisiana, Smith saw a drive-in that used speakers for ordering. He suspected that he could increase his sales by controlling the parking and having the customers order from speakers at their cars, with carhops delivering the food to the cars. Smith borrowed several automobiles from a friend who owned a used-car lot to establish a layout for controlled parking. He also had some so-called "jukebox boys" wire an intercom system in the parking lot. Sales immediately tripled. Charles Woodrow Pappe, an entrepreneur, saw the Shawnee drive-in and was impressed.  He and Smith negotiated the first franchise location in Woodward, Oklahoma, in 1956, based on a handshake. By 1958, two more drive-ins were built, in Enid and Stillwater.

Upon learning that the Top Hat name was already trademarked, Smith and Pappe changed the name to Sonic in 1959. The new name worked with their existing slogan, "Service with the Speed of Sound". After the name change, the first Sonic sign was installed at the Stillwater Top-Hat Drive-In. This was the first of three Sonics in Stillwater. The original Sonic with the first sign was demolished and renovated in May 2015. Although Smith and Pappe were being asked to help open new franchise locations,  no real royalty plan was in place. The pair decided to have their paper company charge an extra penny for each Sonic-label hamburger bag it sold. The proceeds would then be split between Smith and Pappe. The first franchise contracts under this plan were drawn up, but still no joint marketing plan, standardized menu, or detailed operating requirements were in place.

1960s and 1970s

Sonic's founders formed Sonic Supply as a supply and distribution division in the 1960s. Under Smith, longtime franchise holders Marvin Jirous and Matt Kinslow were hired to run the division. In 1973, Sonic Supply was restructured as a franchise company that was briefly named Sonic Systems of America. It provided franchisees with equipment, building plans and basic operational instructions. As the company grew into a regionally-known operation during the 1960s and 1970s, the drive-ins were mainly in small towns in Oklahoma, Texas, Kansas, New Mexico, Missouri, and Arkansas. In 1967, the year Pappe died, the brand had 41 drive-ins. By 1972, this number had risen to 165, and by 1978, 1000.

In 1968, Sonic introduced the Pickle-O's, fried pickle slices.

In 1977, the company established the Sonic School for manager training. Franchisees operated most of the drive-ins and often made the store manager a business partner, even to this day.

1980s and 1990s
In 1983, the company's board of directors hired C. Stephen Lynn as president. In 1984, Lynn hired attorney J. Clifford Hudson to head the legal department. Under Lynn, Sonic and its major franchisees began to encourage the development of local-advertising cooperatives, under the leadership of Keith Sutterfield as advertising manager and later as VP of marketing in which Sutterfield developed a field structure to work with the franchisees. New franchises began to expand the company into new areas and redevelop markets that had been unsuccessful in the past. These developments, combined with a major advertising campaign featuring singer and actor Frankie Avalon, led to significant growth and a new image that  made Sonic a nationally recognized name. In 1986, Lynn, with a group of investors, completed a $10-million leveraged buyout and took the company private. The next year, Sonic moved its offices to leased space in downtown Oklahoma City and began to assume a higher profile in the community.

In 1991, Sonic became a publicly traded company again. By 1994, the corporation had renegotiated the franchise agreements with its franchisees. In 1995, Hudson became president and chief executive officer, and Sonic Industries became Sonic Corp.

During the mid-1990s, Sonic opened 100–150 new restaurants a year. Beginning in 1998, Sonic began a retrofit program, called "Sonic 2000", to redesign and update all  stores in its chain to what was called a "retro-future" look.

2000s
Hudson was named chairman of Sonic Corp. in January 2000.

In September of 2002, Sonic Corporation introduced PartnerNet to its franchisees, an intranet array of services which for the first time, digitally linked all Sonic Drive-in locations to Sonic Corporation.  The new intranet was via Hughes Satellite Services and provided advancements like credit card processing and video training.  The compulsory service package was headlined with the introduction of Sonic Live Radio by StudioStream Signature Sound, featuring a toll-free request line, 866-SONIC-FM, and live on-air personalities.  The live radio style was first of its kind for corporate America, later emulated by the likes of Walmart.  Sonic Live Radio, in beta since 2001, was released to all locations in February of 2003.

Sonic gained further attention in 2003 following the release of comedic reality show The Simple Life starring Paris Hilton and Nicole Richie. Hilton and Richie, previously with no experience in having a job, had to work in a Sonic site in Altas, Arkansas.

Celebrating its 50th birthday in 2003, Sonic briefly added the Birthday Cake Shake to the menu. As a part of the anniversary celebration, Pickle-O's made another appearance as a recurring item. Development milestones celebrated in the 2000s include the opening of the th Sonic Drive-In in Shawnee, Oklahoma, and the th Sonic Drive-In in the Chicago market (Algonquin, Illinois). In October 2004, President Pattye Moore stepped down to spend more time with her family.
On June 28, 2005, helped by new menu items and increased advertising exposure, Sonic Corp. reported double-digit increases in net income and revenue in the third quarter that year. On January 5, 2005,  the company started to install card readers in the drive-in stalls at its 544 company-owned restaurants by the end of January that year. In 2007, the company opened its first restaurants in the Northeastern United States, in Waretown, New Jersey.

In 2009, Sonic partnered with DonorsChoose.org on a collaborative effort, Limeades for Learning, the chain's first systemwide cause marketing initiative. Public school teachers request needed supplies and materials and Sonic customers vote on how to allocate over $500,000 each autumn. In the first seven years of the program, Sonic and its franchisees donated more than $6 million and impacted learning for more than 349,000 students nationwide.

In September 2009, Omar Janjua joined the company as president of its restaurant operating subsidiary, Sonic Restaurants, Inc. and left in 2015.

Despite growth into new markets outside their traditional footprint, the company was hit hard by the recession of 2008–2009. In 2009, the brand had multiple quarters of declines in same-store sales. Plans to bring Sonic to Alaska had not yet come to fruition. On October 26, 2015, Sonic opened its first Rhode Island location in Smithfield, reporting to have received 500 orders on its opening day. In the mid-2010s, the company began a refranchising effort and began to add to its numbers of stores again.

2010s
In January 2010, Sonic announced that they would begin switching to cage-free eggs, gestation crate-free pork, and chickens killed using controlled-atmosphere stunning methods instead of traditional shackling and water-stunning.

Sonic reformulated its soft-serve ice cream to meet the FDA guidelines that define what constitutes real ice cream and introduced Real Ice Cream on May 17, 2010. Several new hot dog items were also introduced in June 2010 and February 2011.

Craig Miller was hired as chief information officer in January 2012. In June 2010, Danielle Vona was hired as chief marketing officer.

In late 2010, Sonic announced the end of its 17-year relationship with advertising agency Barkley. A group of specialized agencies was selected to represent the company, and in early 2011, the San Francisco-based Goodby Silverstein and Partners was named as the new creative agency for the company. In 2017, Sonic announced it would be adding seven new stores in Hawaii in the near future.

On September 25, 2018, Atlanta-based Inspire Brands, owner of Arby's and Buffalo Wild Wings, announced that it will acquire Sonic for $2.3 billion. The acquisition was completed on December 7, 2018.

In September 2017, Sonic opened its first location in Alaska in Wasilla, and a year later it opened its second Alaska location in Fairbanks.

2020s
In 2020, Sonic unveiled a new drive-in design with an updated, wider layout for car docks and the drive-thru lane, a new kitchen layout built for efficiency, and an aesthetic makeover.

By March 2020, all of the restaurants indefinitely suspended patio dining due to COVID-19, but continued to serve take-away & pickup customers.

In November 2020, a mass shooting occurred at the drive-thru of a Sonic restaurant in Bellevue, Nebraska. Two people were killed, and two others were injured. A 23-year-old man was arrested; he had also allegedly made a bomb threat to the restaurant before.

In 2020, Sonic was ranked 14th in QSR Magazine rankings of the top 50 quick-service and fast-casual restaurant brands in the nation.

Company profile

Although Sonic has operated since the early 1950s, Sonic Corp. incorporated in Delaware in 1990. It has its corporate headquarters in Oklahoma City; the headquarters building features a dine-in Sonic restaurant in an adjacent building. Prior to its acquisition by Inspire Brands, its stock traded on NASDAQ with the symbol SONC. Most restaurants are owned and operated by franchisees. Total 2016 revenues were around $100 million with net income of $18 million.

Products 

Sonic's menu consists of hamburgers and French fries, as well as onion rings, corn dogs, chili dogs, and breakfast toaster sandwiches. Drink options include soft drinks, slushes, and milkshakes. Customers can combine various drinks and flavors to create thousands of possible drink combinations. Ice cream desserts include sundaes and floats.

At a standard Sonic Drive-In, a customer drives into a covered drive-in stall, orders through an intercom speaker system, and has the food delivered by a carhop. Most drive-ins also have patio seating, and many have drive-through lanes.

Employee relations

In February 2019,  employees of three Ohio locations resigned en masse due to management changes and a 50% reduction of the employee hourly pay rate. Sonic later released a statement that no employee wages were changing.

As of 2019, Sonic carhops are still not able to receive tips from customers paying by credit or debit card.  Tips can only be paid in cash, though some  carhops make less than minimum wage. A petition on Change.org started in 2017 garnered over 33,000 signatures, but no change was made to Sonic's policy. In 2020, Sonic added tipping feature via the online ordering app. In 2021 Sonic added an option to tip at the stalls.

Sonic Beach

In June 2011, the first location under the name Sonic Beach was opened in Homestead, Florida. A second location, opened in Fort Lauderdale, Florida, in November 2011, lacked drive-in stalls due to its beach-side location. Both locations included outdoor seating and flatscreen televisions, but have since closed. A third location was opened in Miami Gardens. The fourth location was opened January 2014 in Lauderhill.

Along with the traditional menu items, Sonic Beach offered several new items, including popcorn shrimp, Philly cheesesteaks, and pulled pork sandwiches. Sonic Beach serves beer and wine. Remaining locations have been rebranded under the traditional Sonic name, although retaining the Sonic Beach logo.

Advertising
Sonic ran its first television advertisement in 1977. During the early 1980s, actor Tom Bosley was featured in the company's commercials. One of the company's most memorable advertising campaigns, which ran from 1987 to 1993, featured Frankie Avalon. In May 1999, the company began a new campaign featuring the character Katie the Carhop.

Sonic was also involved with NASCAR. The company contracted with Richard Childress Racing in late 2000 to be an associate sponsor for Dale Earnhardt, Sr. during the 2001 NASCAR Winston Cup Series season. After Earnhardt was killed on the last lap of the Daytona 500, the company continued its sponsorship with his replacement driver Kevin Harvick, through the end of the 2003 season. Sonic returned to NASCAR several years later to sponsor Sam Hornish Jr. and Richard Petty Motorsports in 2015.

In 2004, the company became more widely known nationally by advertising in television markets hundreds of miles from its nearest franchise. Improvisational actors T. J. Jagodowski and Peter Grosz became known to American television viewers from their "Two Guys" series of commercials. Similar series of ads for the company have featured other duos of improvisational performers, including Molly Erdman and Brian Huskey, Katie Rich and Sayjal Joshi, and Emily Wilson and Tim Baltz. In 2010, national auditions were held and a new series of commercials began airing, some of which featured carhops from Wisconsin and Austin, Texas. In 2012 the "Two Guys" returned to the company's television ads. In 2018 Sonic supplemented their "Two Guys" commercials with complementary "Two Gals" commercials. The "Two Gals" are played by Ellie Kemper and Jane Krakowski. In 2020, Sonic shifted their "Two Guys" campaign to a new campaign known as "Everyday People" with the same formula but with families  instead of guys.

Slogans used by Sonic over the years include:
 "Service With the Speed of Sound" (1958)
 "Happy Eating" (1980s: on signs at many of the company's drive-ins)
 "America's Drive-In" (1987)
 "Faster and Better than Ever" (1988–1990)
 "No Place Hops like Sonic" (1990–1993)
 "Summer's Funner" (1993)
 "Drive-In for a Change" (1995–1997)
 "All Summer Long" (1997)
 "It's Sonic Good" (2003-2011)
 "Sonic's Got It, Others Don't" (2007)
 "Even Sweeter After Dark" (2009)
 "This is How You Sonic" (2011–2020)
 "Sonic Everywhere" (2016)
 "You Guys Wanna Hang Out Sometime" (2016)
 “This Is How We Sonic” (2020)

See also

 List of hamburger restaurants

References

External links

Companies based in Oklahoma City
Restaurants established in 1953
Drive-in restaurants
Fast-food chains of the United States
Fast-food franchises
Fast-food hamburger restaurants
Hot dog restaurants
Restaurants in Oklahoma
Companies formerly listed on the Nasdaq
Oklahoma culture
Restaurant chains in the United States
1953 establishments in Oklahoma
1991 initial public offerings
2018 mergers and acquisitions
Inspire Brands